The Europe XI is an association football scratch team mainly consisting of players from the UEFA region but, on occasion, players hailing from other continents playing for European teams are invited to play. The European XI play one-off games against clubs, national teams, collectives of other confederations, or a World XI made up of players from all the other continents. Because of this, no governing body in the sport officially recognises the team and each incarnation of the team is not seen as a continuation of any other. The causes for these games are anniversaries, testimonials or for charity. Proceeds earned from the games are donated to good causes and the players, coaching staff, and stadium owners are not paid for the event. In recent years, these games have been broadcast live on television.

Notable coaches 

 Franz Beckenbauer
 Marcello Lippi
 László Kubala
 Frank Rijkaard
 Arsène Wenger
 José Crahay
 Karel Lotsy
 Vittorio Pozzo
 Karl Rappan
 Nereo Rocco

Matches

U18 selection

See also
 Team Europe

Notes

References 

Association football in Europe
Football combination XI teams